Antiotricha directa is a moth of the subfamily Arctiinae. It was described by Paul Dognin in 1924. It is found in Colombia.

References

Moths described in 1924
Arctiini
Moths of South America